Shamlu-ye Bozorg (also Romanized as Shāmlū-ye Bozorg; also known as Shāmlū and Shāmlū-ye Pā'īn) is a village in Qeshlaq Rural District, Abish Ahmad District, Kaleybar County, East Azerbaijan Province, Iran. At the 2006 census, its population was 608, in 122 families. The village is populated by the Kurdish Chalabianlu tribe.

References 

Populated places in Kaleybar County
Kurdish settlements in East Azerbaijan Province